Touchgrind is a series of skateboarding simulation games developed and published by Swedish studio Illusion Labs. The first game released for iOS on October 15, 2010, with a version for iPad released not long after the product's launch on March 31, 2010.

A sequel, Touchgrind Skate 2, was released on November 21, 2013 for both iOS and Android devices. The game allows players to control a variety of different skateboards to complete tricks and score points or take part in competitions to beat your high score.

Following the success of the game, a spin-off series titled Touchgrind BMX was released on May 26, 2011, with a sequel Touchgrind BMX 2 being released on April 11, 2018. A second spin-off, Touchgrind Scooter, was released on June 10, 2021.

Gameplay 
Using touch controls, players are able to control skateboards around a number of different maps in a similar manner to using a fingerboard. Tricks can be completed by using different finger motions, such as releasing the front and then back finger from the screen to complete an ollie or swiping the front finger downwards to do a flip. Points are earned for completing and combining different tricks, as well as for using map elements such as ramps and rails. Different boards are available to unlock, with certain boards having special attributes. Touchgrind Skate 2 introduces a number of improvements to the series, including challenges, board customisation and a turn-based multiplayer mode.

Reception

Touchgrind 

The original Touchgrind received above-average reviews according to the review aggregation website GameRankings. Macworld wrote of the original game, "Touchgrind is a fun, challenging application that takes a different approach to the skateboarding genre. Casual gamers who are used to glitzy stunts and stunning visuals won't find it here. Instead, players who seek difficulty and realistic physics will enjoy the exacting and addictive nature of the game." AppSpy.com noted, "IllusionLabs clearly worked hard trying to translate everything great about skate culture into their game. Aside from a slick skate themed presentation, the skateboard itself has been recreated with stunningly realistic physics for an iPhone game."

Touchgrind BMX 

Touchgrind BMX received "generally favorable reviews" according to the review aggregation website Metacritic.

Touchgrind Skate 2 

Touchgrind Skate 2 received "favorable" reviews according to Metacritic.

References

External links 
 
 
 
 

2008 video games
Android (operating system) games
IOS games
Video games developed in Sweden
Skateboarding video games